The Night Before the Premiere is a 1959 West German musical comedy film directed by Georg Jacoby and starring Marika Rökk, Theo Lingen and Wolfgang Lukschy.

It was made by Real Film at the Wandsbek Studios in Hamburg.

Cast
Marika Rökk as Carola Lorm
Theo Lingen as Karl Schmitt
Wolfgang Lukschy as Kriminalkommissar Peter Hall
Peer Schmidt as Heinz Schmitt
Ursula Grabley as Berta Schmitt
Erna Sellmer as Rosalia Fascinelli
Wiebke Paritz as Barbara Lorm
Fred Raul as Don Alvarez
Wolfgang Neuss as Gavrilo
Carl Voscherau as Friedrich Iversen
Elly Burgmer
Ruth von Hagen
Max Walter Sieg
Benno Gellenbeck
Oscar Müller
Lothar Grützner
Joachim Rake
Peter Frank
Manfred Steffen as Joe
Michael Toost
Rudolf Fenner as Wirt der Arizona-Bar
Bruno Vahl-Berg
Uwe Friedrichsen as policeman
Gerda-Maria Jürgens
Louis Armstrong as himself
Danny Barcelona as himself (drums)
Peanuts Hucko as himself (clarinet)
Billy Kyle as himself (piano)
James Young as himself (trombone)
Mort Herbert as himself (bass)
Billy Mo as himself
Helmut Zacharias as himself

References

External links

West German films
German musical comedy films
1959 musical comedy films
Films directed by Georg Jacoby
Real Film films
Films shot at Wandsbek Studios
1950s German films